"Hold on to the Good Things" is a song by American singer-songwriter Shawn Colvin appearing in the film Stuart Little 2 as the second end-credit song. It was written by Holly Knight and Roxanne Seeman for the film and included in the soundtrack album, released by Epic Soundtrax, Sony Music, on July 19, 2002.

Background

Bonnie Greenberg and Christy Gerhardt, music supervisors for Stuart Little 2, sent Roxanne Seeman the script for Stuart Little 2, asking whether she would write a song. Roxanne Seeman wrote the song with Holly Knight.

"Hold on to the Good Things" was written for a montage scene in the movie where the family is in the dining room.  During a long period of editing where changes were made to scenes in the movie, the recording of the song was put on hold.  The song was chosen out of 100 songs and recorded by Shawn Colvin with Marc Tanner producing, the week the film locked and placed as the second end-credit song, following Celine Dion's "I'm Alive".

Writing and composition 

The song is written in the key of B-flat major with a lively, swing tempo.  The lyrics are uplifting and reassuring, following the movie's themes of friendship and love.

After Glen Brunman of Sony Music Soundtrax heard "Hold on to the Good Things", the lyrics in the chorus were revised:  the words "silvery lining" from the last line of the second verse going into the chorus, was repeated as "silver lining" in the second line of the chorus, replacing "kindness".

During the recording session, Shawn Colvin recorded both lyric versions.  The original unedited version was used in the film.  An edited version with the lyric revision in the chorus appears on the soundtrack.  Ken Karman was the music editor of the film.

Critical reception
Reviewing the Stuart Little 2 soundtrack William Ruhlmann of All Music described the song's  "sunny sentiments".

Credits and personnel
Credits adapted from album's liner notes.

Personnel
 Shawn Colvin – vocals
 Marc Tanner – production
 Kim Richey – background vocals
 Craig Stull –guitar
 Jebin Bruni –keyboards
 Lance Morrison– bass guitar
 Matt Laug – drums, percussion
 Marc Greene – engineer
 Chris Holmes– engineer 
 Gina Fant-Saez– engineer
 David Thoener – mixing engineer
 Jeff Rothschild – mixing engineer 
 Dave Donnelly – mastering
 Douglas Wick, Lucy Fisher, Rob Minkoff – Executive producers

References

Film soundtracks
Shawn Colvin songs
2002 songs
Songs written by Roxanne Seeman
Songs written by Holly Knight
Songs written for films
Songs about friendship
Children's songs
Stuart Little (franchise)